is one of the termini of the  Osaka Metro Tanimachi Line located in Yao, Osaka, Japan. It is numbered "T36".

Station layout
There is an island platform with two tracks on the ground level.

Surrounding area
Osaka City Bus Yao Depot
 Yao Airport

Buses
Kintetsu Bus Co., Ltd. Yaominami-ekimae
Bus stop 1 
Route 70 for -ekimae via  and Yao City Hall
Route 71 for Minami-Taishido
Bus stop 2
Route 08 for  via Rokutan-higashi Jutaku-mae and Yao Municipal Hospital
Route 74 for Numa Yonchome and Ota
Route 75 for Ota Nanachome-nishi, Ishinkai Yao Hospital and Ota
Bus stop 3
Routes 70 and 71 for -ekimae via Ota and Fujiidera City Hall

External links

 Official Site 
 Official Site 

Railway stations in Osaka Prefecture
Railway stations in Japan opened in 1980
Osaka Metro stations